The  was a caftan-like tunic in the Byzantine Empire.

The garment was likely of Persian origin, and took the form of a long-sleeved tunic, worn belted, with slits on front and back or the sides, indicating a likely origin as a rider's garment.

The garment was popular among Byzantine courtiers, and became the main everyday court uniform of the middle Byzantine period, along with the  cloak. The Byzantine emperors alone had the right to wear  of imperial purple, but red and golden variants were also worn by emperors. Surviving depictions show the garment made of silk, with gold armbands and a gold border along the hem and slits. 

According to Liutprand of Cremona,  were used as diplomatic gifts by the emperors.

References

Sources 

 
 

Byzantine clothing